Government Medical College, Shahdol is a full-fledged tertiary Medical college in Shahdol, Madhya Pradesh. It was established in the year 2018. The college imparts the degree of Bachelor of Medicine and Surgery (MBBS). Nursing and para-medical courses are also offered. The college is affiliated to Madhya Pradesh Medical Science University and is recognized by Medical Council of India. The selection to the college is done on the basis of merit through National Eligibility and Entrance Test.

Courses
Government Medical College, Shahdol undertakes the education and training of students MBBS courses.

References

External links 
 Official site

2018 establishments in Madhya Pradesh
Affiliates of Madhya Pradesh Medical Science University
Educational institutions established in 2018
Medical colleges in Madhya Pradesh